The Battle of Adwa, also called the Battle of the Assem, Asem, Asam, or Assam river, was a battle fought in 1871 between the forces of Kassa Mercha of Tigray and Emperor Tekle Giyorgis II. It resulted in victory for Kassa, allowing him to eventually become crowned as Emperor of Ethiopia.
This battle has been noted by some as one of the first 'truly modern' battles in Ethiopian history, given that the tactics used by Kassa of Tigray revolved around the use of gunpowder weaponry.

References

Battles involving Ethiopia
Gunpowder
1870s in Ethiopia
Emperors of Ethiopia